The 2009 Siemens Open was a professional tennis tournament played on outdoor red clay courts. This was the seventeenth edition of the tournament which is part of the Tretorn SERIE+ of the 2009 ATP Challenger Tour. It took place in Scheveningen, Netherlands between 6 July and 12 July 2009.

Singles entrants

Seeds

 Rankings are as of June 29, 2009.

Other entrants
The following players received wildcards into the singles main draw:
  Stephan Fransen
  Thomas Schoorel
  Raemon Sluiter

The following players received entry from the qualifying draw:
  Augustin Gensse
  Rameez Junaid
  Gero Kretschmer
  Filip Prpic
  Adam Vejmělka (as a Lucky Loser)

Champions

Singles

 Kristof Vliegen def.  Albert Montañés, 4–2, RET.

Doubles

 Lucas Arnold Ker /  Máximo González def.  Thomas Schoorel /  Nick van der Meer, 7–5, 6–2

References
Official website
ITF Search 

Siemens Open
Tretorn SERIE+ tournaments
Clay court tennis tournaments
The Hague Open
2009 in Dutch tennis